Twin Sector is a first-person action-adventure game developed by DNS Development and published by Got Game Entertainment and Headup Games for the PC Windows in 2009. It uses havok for realtime physics.

Gameplay
Summary: The story of Twin Sector takes place in a post-apocalyptic future where the remains of mankind have been put to artificial sleep in cryogenic chambers deep under the contaminated surface of earth - until the planet becomes habitable again. You as the player must take the role of Ashley Simms, the protagonist of Twin Sector. Suddenly awakened by the station's security A.I. system O.S.C.A.R., you face the imminent extinction of all other still sleeping survivors due to an unknown failure in the life support system. According to O.S.C.A.R., you are the only person who was able to be woken and therefore the only individual capable of saving mankind. Within the next ten hours you will need to repair the broken main generator of the subterranean bunker system in order to reestablish the station's functionality. But there are yet unknown forces trying to prevent you from succeeding at all costs. Twin Sector is a thrilling physics-based action-adventure which allows players free interaction with their environment. Using the advantages of the powerful HAVOK-Engine, innumerable puzzles, challenges and enemies await the players in a hostile and threatening futuristic environment. Featuring more than 15 missions alongside a thrilling story line unfolding over the course of action.

Plot

Reception
Twin Sector received generally unfavourable reviews, resulting in an averaged Metacritic score of 49/100, albeit PC Gamer UK gave it a positive 77/100. Steve Butts from IGN gave this "doubly disappointing" game a score of 4/10 ("Bad"), opining it is "stealing some of the best ideas from other physics-based puzzle games" but "the end result is an exercise in wasted potential" that "fails on nearly every level." Similarly, Cole Smith from Cheat Code Central, who gave it a score of 2.7/5 ("Average"), came to a conclusion that "the developers erringly assume that these elements define the genre, but that's just a lazy excuse for not creating and implementing original ideas."

References

External links
Official website
Twin Sector on Steam

2009 video games
Action-adventure games
First-person adventure games
Post-apocalyptic video games
Science fiction video games
Video games developed in Germany
Video games featuring female protagonists
Video games set in the future
Windows games
Windows-only games
Got Game Entertainment games
Single-player video games
Headup Games games